Alexander or Alex Gray may refer to:

Alexander Gray (lawyer) (1860–1933), New Zealand King's Counsel
Alexander Gray (poet) (1882–1968), Scottish poet
Alexander Gray (RAF officer) (1896–1980), Royal Air Force leader during World War II
Alexander T. Gray, fourth Secretary of State of Wisconsin
Alex Gray (author) (born 1950), Scottish author
Alex Gray (ice hockey) (1898–1986), Canadian ice hockey player
Alex Gray (safety), American football safety for Edmonton Eskimos
Alex Gray (sportsman, born 1991), rugby union and American football player

See also
Alex Grey (born 1953), U.S. artist